Second Thoughts is a 1983 American comedy-drama film directed by Lawrence Turman and starring Lucie Arnaz, Craig Wasson, Ken Howard and Anne Schedeen.

It was the second feature directed by Turman, who was better known as a producer.

Plot
Lawyer Amy finds herself courted by two very different men: her client, a roguish street musician named Will, and her old boyfriend John Michael. A curious triangle develops as Amy gets pregnant by Will and both men vie for her affections.

Cast
 Lucie Arnaz as Amy
 Craig Wasson as Will
 Ken Howard as John Michael
 Anne Schedeen as Janis
 Arthur Rosenberg as Dr. Eastman
 Peggy McCay as Dr. Carpenter
 Tammy Taylor as Sharon
 James O'Connell as Chief Staab
 Louis Giambalvo as Sergeant Cabrillo
 Alex Kubik as Officer Behnke
 Charles Lampkin as Judge Richards
 Michael Prince as Alfred Venable
 Susan Duvall as Trudy
 Larry David as Monroe Clark
 Joseph Whipp as Jailer
 Annette McCarthy as Nurse

Production
Filming started late 1981 and was completed by February 1982. Much of the film was shot in Santa Fe.

Lucie Arnaz chose to do this film over Poltergeist which she had also been offered because she believed it gave her a better acting opportunity.

Reception
The Los Angeles Times said the film "doesn't warrant a second thought".

References

External links

Second Thoughts at TCMDB
Second Thoughts at BFI

1983 films
1980s romantic comedy-drama films
American romantic comedy-drama films
Films scored by Henry Mancini
Films shot in New Mexico
Universal Pictures films
EMI Films films
1983 comedy films
1983 drama films
1980s English-language films
1980s American films